= Chor Sagoni =

- village
- Location within Madhya Pradesh Location within India
- Coordinates: 23.2363705°N 77.5368628°E
- Country: India
- State: Madhya Pradesh
- District: Bhopal
- Tehsil: Huzur
- Elevation: 457 m (1,499 ft)

Population (2011)
  - Total: 201
- Time zone: UTC+5:30 (IST)
- ISO 3166 code: MP-IN
- 2011 census code: 482451

Chor Sagoni is a village in the Bhopal district of Madhya Pradesh, India. It is located in the Huzur tehsil and the Phanda block.

== Demographics ==
According to the 2011 census of India, Chor Sagoni has 38 households. The effective literacy rate (i.e. the literacy rate of population excluding children aged 6 and below) is 73.01%.

Demographics (2011 Census)
	Total	Male	Female
Population	201	100	101
Children aged below 6 years	38	17	21
Scheduled caste	28	16	12
Scheduled tribe	25	15	10
Literates	119	67	52
Workers (all)	57	48	9
Main workers (total)	57	48	9
Main workers: Cultivators	16	15	1
Main workers: Agricultural labourers	35	28	7
Main workers: Household industry workers	0	0	0
Main workers: Other	6	5	1
Marginal workers (total)	0	0	0
Marginal workers: Cultivators	0	0	0
Marginal workers: Agricultural labourers	0	0	0
Marginal workers: Household industry workers	0	0	0
Marginal workers: Others	0	0	0
Non-workers	144	52	92
